William Carey Publishing, previously known as William Carey Library, is a book publishing company based in Pasadena, California. It was one of the first companies to publish mission resources exclusively. William Carey Library is part of the U.S. Center for World Mission and was named after William Carey, known as the "father of modern missions."

Upon celebrating the organization's 50th anniversary, 1969–2019, William Carey Library rebranded to William Carey Publishing. While the organization is still focused on publishing missiological resources, it is expanding the breadth of its offerings to accommodate the needs of the next 50 years in missions. William Carey Publishing also relocated in 2018 to its new home in Littleton, Colorado.

External links
Official site

Book publishing companies based in California
Publishing companies established in 1969
Companies based in Los Angeles County, California
1969 establishments in California